Mohammad Riaz is an Afghan cricketer. He made his List A debut for Band-e-Amir Region in the 2017 Ghazi Amanullah Khan Regional One Day Tournament on 11 August 2017.

References

External links
 

Year of birth missing (living people)
Living people
Afghan cricketers
Band-e-Amir Dragons cricketers
Place of birth missing (living people)